The 2019 NASCAR Hall of Fame 200 was a NASCAR Gander Outdoors Truck Series race held on October 26, 2019, at Martinsville Speedway in Ridgeway, Virginia. Contested over 200 laps on the .526 mile (.847 km) paperclip-shaped short track, it was the 21st race of the 2019 NASCAR Gander Outdoors Truck Series season, fifth race of the Playoffs, and second race of the Round of 6.

Background

Track

Martinsville Speedway is an International Speedway Corporation-owned NASCAR stock car racing track located in Henry County, in Ridgeway, Virginia, just to the south of Martinsville. At  in length, it is the shortest track in the Monster Energy NASCAR Cup Series. The track was also one of the first paved oval tracks in NASCAR, being built in 1947 by H. Clay Earles. It is also the only remaining race track that has been on the NASCAR circuit from its beginning in 1948.

Entry list

Practice

First practice

Final practice

Qualifying

Qualifying results

. – Playoffs driver

Race

Summary
Christian Eckes started on pole, but Brett Moffitt took the lead from him and held it until the end of Stage 1. One caution occurred during Stage 1 for Ray Ciccarelli spinning.

In Stage 2, Tanner Gray spun on lap 78 and brought out a caution. The leaders pitted, giving the lead to Grant Enfinger on lap 82, while Matt Crafton stalled out with engine issues. Sam Mayer took the lead on the restart and held it to the end of  the second stage.

Stage 3 began with several wrecks; the first occurring when Natalie Decker collided with Jeb Burton and collected Moffitt, Dawson Cram, and Tyler Dippel. Another caution occurred immediately after the restart as Ross Chastain slipped past Mayer before Mayer was involved in a wreck that also involved Austin Hill, Tyler Ankrum, Enfinger, and Todd Gilliland, which brought out a lengthy red flag. The race afterwards had numerous cautions; Ciccarelli spun again, while Stewart Friesen was turned by Johnny Sauter. Eckes briefly took the lead away from Chastain but lost it soon after, while Spencer Boyd collided with Jordan Anderson, also collecting Norm Benning and Ben Rhodes.

With 20 laps remaining, Jennifer Jo Cobb's truck lost an axle, and Gilliland passed Chastain for the lead on the restart with 10 laps left. The final caution came on lap 194 when Decker and Anderson collided and collected Gus Dean, setting up an overtime.

Harrison Burton had contact with Chastain on the final lap, beginning a series of incidents. Gilliland survived the incidents and took the victory, with Chastain finishing second. Timmy Hill notably earned his best finish of 5th place in the race.

Similarly to the previous week's race, none of the playoffs drivers had locked themselves into the final round due to a non-playoffs driver winning the race. Crafton and Ankrum left the race below the cutoff line.

Fox Sports 1 was heavily criticized for cutting off the live feed of the race's final two laps in order to switch to the college football game between the Oklahoma State Cowboys and the Iowa State Cyclones. As a result, NASCAR fans not in attendance missed Gilliland's win.

Stage results

Stage One
Laps: 50

Stage Two
Laps: 50

Final Stage results

Stage Three
Laps: 100

. – Driver advanced to the next round of the playoffs.

. – Playoffs driver

References

2019 in sports in Virginia
NASCAR Hall of Fame 200
NASCAR races at Martinsville Speedway